Original Hits is a retrospective compilation album by Cuban artist Pitbull, spanning the 2004 to 2008 period of his career when he was signed to TVT Records (now-defunct). It was released in the United States on May 8, 2012 by The Orchard who bought all of the rights to TVT's assets and previous catalogs, and later that same month in Australia and the United Kingdom. Original Hits features several of Pitbull's guest appearances, remixes and some unreleased tracks. It does not contain any of his more recent hit singles.

Pitbull acknowledged that album at the time of its release by saying "I wouldn’t be where I am today without these songs. Each one represents a step on my journey from Mr. 305 to Mr. Worldwide. This album is a good introduction for newer fans and a reminder to longtime fans of how far we’ve come together." Despite not being promoted with any singles or marketing initiatives, Original Hits charted in the top-twenty on the U.S. Independent Albums, R&B Albums and Rap Albums charts, as published by Billboard. It also charted at number 136 on the main Billboard 200 albums chart.

Critical reception 
David Jeffries praised the choice of singles included from the 2004 to 2008 period of Pitbull's career, pick out "the spicy crunk anthem "The Anthem," the hypnotic reggaeton floor filler "Culo," and the raw, pounding "Bojangles," all of them sounding flashy, big, and like the start of a penthouse pool party where every beer has a lime on top." He also said that the choice of album tracks to complete the compilation were strong and that hardcore fans would appreciate the three bonus tracks, previously unreleased or from mixtapes.

Track listing

Charts

Release history

References

Spanish-language albums
Pitbull (rapper) albums
Albums produced by Jim Jonsin
Albums produced by Mr. Collipark
2012 remix albums
TVT Records remix albums
Albums produced by DJ Toomp